Tinolius is a genus of moths in the family Erebidae. The genus was erected by Francis Walker in 1855.

Description
Palpi obliquely porrect (extending forward) and hairy. Antennae bipectinated (comb like on both sides) in male and ciliated in female. Thorax tuftless. Abdomen with dorsal tufts. Forewings with vein 10 runs from beyond the end of areole. Larva with two pairs of abdominal prolegs.

Species
Tinolius eburneigutta
Tinolius hypsana
Tinolius quadrimaculatus
Tinolius sundensis

References

Tinoliinae
Moth genera